Evelyn Quigley is a camogie player, winner of All-Ireland Senior medals in 2007, 2010 and 2011.

Family Background
Evelyn is daughter of Eileen and  Dan Quigley, Wexford's All-Ireland winning Senior hurling captain of 1968. She spent some time in London where she lined out with the Fr. Murphy's club, and also with the county team in the All Ireland Junior championship.

Other awards
National Camogie League medals in 2009, 2010 and 2011; Leinster Senior 2011, 2010, 2004, 2003, 2001, 2000, 1999; Leinster U18 1998, 1997; Leinster Junior 2004, 2003. Winner of All-Ireland Senior club medal in 1995; three Leinster Senior Club 1995, 1996, 2000; Club Senior 1995, 1996, 1999, 2000, 2008; London Club Senior 2007; three Senior 'B' Club 2002, 2005, 2006; Leinster Under-18 1997, 1998; Leinster Senior 1999, 2000, 2001, 2003, 2004; Leinster Junior 2003, 2004; Ashbourne Cup with WIT 2001.

References

External links
 Camogie.ie Official Camogie Association Website
 Wexford Wexford camogie site

1981 births
Living people
Wexford camogie players
Alumni of Waterford Institute of Technology
Waterford IT camogie players